The Diocese of Hildesheim (Latin: Dioecesis Hildesiensis)  is a diocese of the Catholic Church in Germany. Founded in 815 as a missionary diocese by King Louis the Pious, his son Louis the German appointed the famous former archbishop of Rheims, Ebbo, as bishop.

The modern Diocese of Hildesheim presently covers those parts of the state of Lower Saxony that are east of the River Weser, northern neighborhoods in Bremen, and the city of Bremerhaven. The current bishop is Heiner Wilmer who was appointed in 2018. The diocese is a suffragan to the Archdiocese of Hamburg since 1994. Originally Hildesheim was suffragan to Mainz until 1805. Then it was an exempt diocese until 1930, before it was part of the Middle German Ecclesiastical Province with Paderborn Archdiocese as metropolitan between 1930 and 1994.

Prince-bishopric
Between 1235 and 1802, the bishop of Hildesheim was also Prince of the Holy Roman Empire. His Hochstift (feudal princely territory) was the Prince-Bishopric of Hildesheim. In the 16th century, most of the diocese as well as most of the state of Hildesheim switched to Protestantism, but the bishopric managed to retain its independence from the surrounding Protestant states of Brunswick-Lüneburg, mostly because its bishops were members of the powerful House of Wittelsbach from 1573 until 1761.

Diocesan ambit
Until 1824 the diocesan ambit remained unchanged, despite various changes of the political borders in history up to this date. After the Napoleonic wars the newly established Kingdom of Hanover stipulated with the Holy See to extend the Hildesheim diocesan ambit to all of the then Hanoverian territory east of the Weser river. The newly included areas were Lutheran with a little Catholic diaspora and had formed part of the defunct dioceses of Bremen, of Mainz and of Verden before the Reformation.

 Hannover's cession of land for Bremerhaven in 1827 to the prevailingly Reformed Bremen State did not alter the diocesan ambit. In 1834 the prevailingly Lutheran Duchy of Brunswick left the Apostolic Vicariate of Anhalt and agreed to extend Hildesheim's ambit to the ducal territory. Thus the diocese covered areas in three sovereign states, with all of which and thus all the diocesan area becoming part of united Germany in 1871.

The incorporation of Hanoverian suburbs into Bremen city (Bremen North borough) in 1939 did not alter the ambit. In 1965 Hildesheim ceded that part of the then Hoya County District east of the Weser to the diocese of Osnabrück, whereas Osnabrück in return ceded Cuxhaven, Neuwerk, Scharhörn, Schaumburg-Lippe, as well as parts of the districts of Verden, Holzminden, Hameln-Pyrmont located west of the Weser, and the quarters of Nienburg upon Weser west of the river to Hildesheim. In 1995 Hildesheim ceded its Harburg deanery in Hamburg south of the Elbe to the Archdiocese of Hamburg following the erection of this new see.

Episcopal ordinaries

Dietmar † (20 Aug 1038 Ordained Bishop – 14 Nov 1044 Died) 
Magnus Herzog von Sachsen-Lauenburg † (12 May 1424 Succeeded – 20 May 1452 Resigned) 
Bernhard Herzog von Braunschweig-Lüneburg † (20 May 1452 Appointed – 1458 Resigned) 
Ernst Graf von Schaumberg † ( 1458 Appointed – 22 July 1471 Died) 
Henning von Haus † (29 Sep 1471 Appointed – Nov 1480 Resigned) 
Berthold II of Landsberg † ( 1481 Appointed – 4 May 1502 Died) 
Erich Herzog von Sachsen-Lauenburg † (2 Dec 1502 Confirmed – 1504 Resigned) 
John IV of Saxe-Lauenburg † (12 July 1503 Appointed – 6 May 1527 Resigned) 
Balthasar Merklin † (6 May 1527 Appointed – 28 May 1531 Died) 
Otto Graf von Schaumberg † (28 July 1531 Appointed – 22 Dec 1576 Died) 
Valentin von Tetleben † (30 Sep 1537 Appointed – 19 April 1551 Died) 
Friedrich Herzog von Schleswig-Holstein † (3 Oct 1551 Appointed – 27 Oct 1556 Died) 
Burchard Oberg † (31 March 1557 Appointed – 23 Feb 1573 Died) 
Ernst Herzog von Bayern † (7 March 1573 Appointed – 17 Feb 1612 Died) 
Ferdinand Herzog von Bayern † (17 Feb 1612 Succeeded – 13 Sep 1650 Died) 
Max Heinrich Herzog von Bayern † (13 Sep 1650 Succeeded – 3 June 1688 Died) 
Jobst Edmund Freiherr von Brabeck † (19 Jul 1688 Appointed – 13 Aug 1702 Died) 
Joseph Clemens Kajetan Herzog von Bayern † ( 1714 Succeeded – 11 Dec 1723 Died) 
Clemens August Maria Herzog von Bayern † (5 Feb 1724 Appointed – 6 Feb 1761 Died) 
Friedrich Wilhelm Freiherr von Westphalen † (7 Feb 1763 Appointed – 6 Jan 1789 Died) 
Franz Egon Freiherr von Fürstenberg † (6 Jan 1789 Succeeded – 11 Aug 1825 Died) 
Karl Klemens Reichsfreiherr von Gruben † (11 Aug 1825 Appointed – 4 July 1827 Died) 
Godehard Joseph Osthaus † (26 March 1829 Appointed – 30 Dec 1835 Died) 
Franz Ferdinand (Johann Franz) Fritz, Benedictines (O.S.B.) † (10 March 1836 Appointed – 6 Sep 1840 Died) 
Jakob Joseph Wandt † (9 Dec 1841 Appointed – 16 Oct 1849 Died) 
Eduard Jakob Wedekin † (27 Nov 1849 Appointed – 25 Dec 1870 Died) 
Daniel Wilhelm Sommerwerk (Jacobi) † (13 April 1871 Appointed – 18 Dec 1905 Died) 
Adolf Bertram † (26 April 1906 Appointed – 25 May 1914 Appointed, Archbishop of Breslau (Wrocław)) 
Joseph Ernst † (10 Feb 1915 Appointed – 5 May 1928 Died) 
Nikolaus Bares † (15 Jan 1929 Appointed – 27 Oct 1933 Appointed, Bishop of Berlin) 
Joseph Godehard Machens † (22 June 1934 Appointed – 14 Aug 1956 Died) 
Heinrich Maria Janssen † (3 Feb 1957 Appointed – 28 Dec 1983 Retired) 
Josef Homeyer (25 Aug 1983 Appointed – 20 Aug 2004 Retired) 
Norbert Trelle (29 Nov 2005 Appointed – 9 Sep 2017 Retired )
Heiner Wilmer (7 April 2018 Appointed - )

Notes

External links 
 Official site
 

 
Hildesheim
Hildesheim
Hildesheim
Hildesheim diocese
9th-century establishments in Germany